ISO 3166-2:VA is the entry for Vatican City in ISO 3166-2, part of the ISO 3166 standard published by the International Organization for Standardization (ISO), which defines codes for the names of the principal subdivisions (e.g., provinces or states) of all countries coded in ISO 3166-1.

Currently no ISO 3166-2 codes are defined in the entry for Vatican City. The country has no defined subdivisions.

Vatican City is officially assigned the ISO 3166-1 alpha-2 code .

References

External links
 ISO Online Browsing Platform: VA
 Vatican City, Statoids.com

2:VA
Geography of Vatican City